Clepsis longilabis is a species of moth of the family Tortricidae. It is found in São Paulo, Brazil.

The wingspan is about 14 mm. The ground colour of the forewings is grey with darker strigulation (fine streaks) and blackish dots along the termen. The markings are brownish. The hindwings are pale brown, but more cream basally.

Etymology
The species name refers to the long labis.

References

Moths described in 2010
Clepsis